Donna Scott-Mottley (born 6 October 1956 in Westmoreland Parish) is a Jamaican politician from the People's National Party. She served in the Senate of Jamaica in the 1990s, before returning on 3 November 2005, replacing Keste Miller.

References

See also 

 14th Parliament of Jamaica

1956 births
Living people
People's National Party (Jamaica) politicians
20th-century Jamaican politicians
20th-century Jamaican women politicians
21st-century Jamaican politicians
21st-century Jamaican women politicians
Members of the Senate of Jamaica
Jamaican lawyers
People from Westmoreland Parish